The Arab Women's Federation was a women's organization in Jordan, founded in 1954. It played in important role in the introduction of women's suffrage in Jordan.

It was founded by Emily Bisharat. While several women's organizations had been founded in Jordan since the foundation of United Women's Social Organization in 1944, the previous women's organization had been focused on social work, and the Arab Women's Federation was the first women's organization in Jordan to campaign specificially for reforms in women's rights.

The Federation worked for the introduction of women's suffrage in Jordan. It also worked for expanded access to education and work for women. The Federation worked for a reform in the Islamic Family Law, specifically to abolish the exclusive polygamy for men, and extend the right to divorce for women as well as men.

Suffrage were given to educated women in 1955, and to all women in 1974, but no election was held until 1989, when women's suffrage was finally effectuated.

References 

1954 establishments in Jordan
Feminist organizations in Asia
Organizations established in 1954
Social history of Jordan
Organisations based in Jordan
History of women in Jordan